, better known as , is a Japanese comedian, reporter, and radio personality who is represented by the talent agency, Wako Promotion.

Filmography

TV series
Current

Past

Radio series
Current

Past

Podcasts

Store broadcasting

Films

References

External links
Wako Production 
Tajin Production Committee 

Japanese comedians
Japanese radio personalities
1962 births
Living people
People from Osaka